The Taller de Gráfica Popular (Spanish: "People's Graphic Workshop") is an artist's print collective founded in Mexico in 1937 by artists Leopoldo Méndez, Pablo O'Higgins, and Luis Arenal. The collective was primarily concerned with using art to advance revolutionary social causes. The print shop became a base of political activity and abundant artistic output, and attracted many foreign artists as collaborators.

History
The Workshop was founded in 1937 following the dissolution of the Liga de Escritores y Artistas Revolucionarios (LEAR, Revolutionary Writers’ and Artists’ League), a group of artists who had supported the goals of the Mexican Revolution.

Initially called the Taller Editorial de Gráfica Popular, its founders built off a rich tradition of printmaking in Mexico, particularly the legacy of José Guadalupe Posada and Manuel Manilla.

Under President Lázaro Cárdenas, the work of the Taller supported the government's policies, including the Mexican oil expropriation.

In 1940, muralist David Alfaro Siqueiros launched an armed assault on the residence of exiled Russian Revolutionary Leon Trotsky, using the Taller's print shop as a headquarters and including some artists affiliated with the Taller in his squad.

There was some collaboration between the TGP and the artists of the New Deal-era Works Progress Administration, including Rafael Tufiño.

Artists from outside Mexico came to work and study at the Taller, including Mariana Yampolsky, the first female member of the Taller, who arrived in 1945 and remained until 1960, and Elizabeth Catlett, who worked with the Taller from 1946 to 1966. Both took Mexican citizenship. During the Civil Rights Movement, Chicano and African American artists produced work at the Taller. The Taller became inspiration to many politically active leftist artists; for example, American expressionist painter Byron Randall went on to found similar artist collectives after becoming an associate member.

The TGP faced financial instability and had to relocate several times, but Jesús Álvarez Amaya kept it running up to his death in 2010.

Work
During its heyday, the Taller specialized in linoleum prints and woodcuts. It produced posters, handbills, banners, and portfolio editions. The art supported causes such as anti-militarism, organized labor, and opposition to fascism.
 
The art was often made through the collaborative process, and the Taller took the anti-commercial policy of not numbering prints, but it sold prints as part of and was the first political publishing workshop in Mexico to do so.

Under the brand La Estampa Mexicana, the TGP sold song lyrics, posters of heroes and Mexican culture and Left movements worldwide, and gave rise to a new generation of calaveras, the Mexican tradition of humorous poetry ridiculing politicians and other popular figures. The raised fist emerged as a graphic symbol of resistance and unity.

It still working on art and social issues and it is located in Dr. Manuel Villada 46, Colonia Doctores, Mexico City.

References

External links
 Walker, John. "Taller de Gráfica Popular". Glossary of Art, Architecture & Design since 1945, 3rd. ed.
 Gráfica Mexciana, a searchable, sortable catalog of works from the Taller de Gráfica Popular, with more than 4,700 entries and 150 works of art.

Mexican artist groups and collectives
Social realism
Arts organizations established in 1937
1937 establishments in Mexico